Not Alone is the debut Korean solo single of Park Jung-min of South Korean boy band SS501. It was released on 20 January 2011 by CNr Media and distributed by LOEN Entertainment. The single album was originally planned to be released on 25 November 2010, but due to the rising tensions between South Korea and North Korea, Park and his company decided to push back his album release and promotions to the beginning of 2011.

Park Jung-min joined hands with the star producer Shinsadong Tiger in order to create the single album. Park is also involved in the album production as a lyricist. From the title song "Not Alone" to "넌 알고 있니" and "내 하루는 매일매일 크리스마스", Park Jung-min personally participated in the composition of the lyrics.

The single was also released in Japan on 17 February 2011. The release is in the form of a CD Book, which combines a physical CD along with an 8-page A5 sized photo book.

Track listing

Music videos
 "Not Alone"

Release history

Charts

Sales and certifications

References

External links
 
 

SS501 songs
2011 singles
South Korean songs
Songs written by Shinsadong Tiger
Song recordings produced by Shinsadong Tiger
Songs written by Park Jung-min (singer)